Dr. Juan Gomez Nolasco High School is one of the schools and a public secondary school in Manila City. It is located at 2252 Tioco Street Barangay 91, Tondo, Manila.

History 

It was founded on October 25, 1966. It was named after Dr. Juan G. Nolasco, a former Manila Mayor.

Description 
DR. JUAN G. NOLASCO HIGH SCHOOL shall have been owned and directed by the community, teachers, school administrators, students, parents and local officials actively participating in the renewal and development of Manila and the community where they belong; morally upright; equipped with necessary skills and competency and keenly aware of the fast changing world they live in.

Mission 
Improve student and teaching performance to the highest attainable level of competencies; cultivate a climate of shared responsibilities; partnership; collaboration among stakeholders; take a more active role in the development and implementation of appropriate school initiatives; raise schools’ own standards based on the particular needs and resources within the community; increase participation, completion, retention and achievement.

Education in Tondo, Manila
Educational institutions established in 1966
High schools in Manila